Above the Weeping World is the third studio album by Insomnium. It was released on August 9, 2006, in Europe and on October 17, 2006, elsewhere by Candlelight Records. A music video was made for "Mortal Share."

During its first week, the album peaked at #9 on the Finnish album charts (week 39/2006).

The album's lyrics have been influenced by (and occasionally taken from) classic poets like Hölderlin, Edgar Allan Poe, and Finnish classic Eino Leino. The last track of the album, "In the Groves of Death" lasts about ten minutes, and its main theme is heavily inspired by Leino's poem Tumma, the ending poem of his saga Helkavirsiä. The entire poem "The Night Has a Thousand Eyes" by English poet Francis William Bourdillon is used as a chorus in the album's third track "Drawn to Black".
Above the Weeping World has received extraordinary reviews both in Finland (e.g. SUE magazine 10/10)) and abroad (e.g. Kerrang! 5/5), and the album debuted on the Finnish album charts at the 9th position (week 39/2006), which is a remarkable achievement for a melodic death metal band. At the same time, Insomnium embarked on their first full European tour, playing 36 gigs in six weeks (5.9 - 15.10), in 15 countries.

Track listing

Personnel 

 Insomnium
 Niilo Sevänen − vocals, bass
 Ville Friman − guitars
 Ville Vänni − guitars
 Markus Hirvonen − drums

 Additional Musicians
 Keyboard arrangements by Aleksi Munter; keyboard parts composed by Aleksi Munter, Ville Friman & Niilo Sevänen
 Antti Haapanen: additional vocals on tracks 6 & 9

 Production
 Arranged and produced by Insomnium
 Engineered & mixed By Samu Oittinen (between April 7-May 14, 2006)
 Mastered by Minerva Pappi (June 5, 2006 at Finnvox Studios)

 Other
 Band photos by Ville Kaisla and Jussi Särkilahti
 Art direction by Ville Kaisla and assisted by Olli-Pekka Saloniemi

Release history

References

External links 
 Insomnium official site

Insomnium albums
2006 albums